Rodrigo de Rato y Figaredo (born 18 March 1949) is a Spanish politician who served in the Council of Ministers from 1996 to 2004. He also served as the ninth managing director of the International Monetary Fund (IMF) from 2004 to 2007 and the president of Bankia from 2010 to 2012.

Rato was arrested on 16 April 2015 for alleged fraud, embezzlement and money laundering. His case was still awaiting trial a year later when his name appeared in the Panama Papers. Despite his prior assurances that he did not own companies in tax havens, apparently he used two offshore companies to avoid taxes on millions of euros kept overseas. It has been alleged that he owes taxes to both the Spanish and Panamanian governments.

On 23 February 2017, Rato was found guilty of embezzlement and sentenced to 4½ years' imprisonment. In September 2018, the sentence was confirmed by the Supreme Court of Spain., and Rato entered prison on 25 October 2018.

Early life and education
Rodrigo de Rato was born in Madrid, into a rich textile-owning family from Asturias. He is the great-grandson of politician Faustino Rodríguez-San Pedro y Díaz-Argüelles and the son of businessman Ramón Rato who was jailed in 1967 for tax evasion to Switzerland through his Banco Siero, and of Aurora Figaredo Sela. Both the Rato and the Figaredo sides of his family owned industries and nobility titles.  Rato attended a Jesuit school Our Lady of Remembrance College, Madrid before studying law in the Complutense University.

In 1971 Rato went to University of California, Berkeley, and received an MBA in 1974 from the Haas School of Business.

Career

Early beginnings
In 1975 Rato became involved in the family business, first in Fuensanta, an Asturian mineral water company, and then in two Madrid construction firms. He also became involved in expanding the Cadena Rato chain of radio stations.

In 1977 Rato joined the newly formed Popular Alliance (AP), a party containing former ministers of Franco, founded by Manuel Fraga, a close personal friend of his father. In December 1979 Rato was elected to the national executive committee, and became secretary of the AP economic commission. In February 1981 he became one of the party's five Secretaries-General, and was considered to be their economic expert. He supported tight controls on public spending, and an emphasis on the supply side of economics. In October 1982 he won election as an AP member of the Congress of Deputies for Cádiz in spite of having no connection to this Andalucian town. He represented the area until 1989 and subsequently represented Madrid from 1989 to 2000.

The 1982 election handed a loss to the AP, and marked the beginning of the long rule of the PSOE and Felipe González. Until 1984 Rato was the Secretary of the parliamentary group. He then became their economic affairs spokesman where he impressed the party with his attacks on the PSOE's economic policies. He was seen to be on the liberal wing of the party.

When Fraga resigned from the leadership in December 1986 Rato backed Miguel Herrero y Rodríguez de Miñón who lost the leadership race to Antonio Hernández Mancha, but managed to keep his positions within the party. During these years he also continued his business career in Aguas de Fuensanta; having previously been the CEO of the company from 1978 to 1982, he served as chairman from 1985 to 1991. In June 1989 Fraga again became interim President after the generally acknowledged failure of the leadership of Hernández Mancha. The party became the slightly more inclusive People's Party (PP). Rato was given shared responsibility over the elections with Francisco Álvarez-Cascos Fernández, the new party Secretary General. He was a close supporter of José María Aznar, who was voted as the new PP leader on 4 September.

On 29 October, the PP lost the general election, though his role in the campaign gave him national prominence. Afterwards he was appointed party spokesman. On 2 April 1990 his father sold the family stake in Cadena Rato for 5 billion pesetas. In June 1991 he stopped being President of Fuensanta, but remained on the board until 1993. On 6 June that year the PP lost another general election to PSOE. In the 12th National Congress in January 1996 he was confirmed as one of the three vice secretaries of the party.

Minister of Economy and vice president

Then on 3 March 1996 the PP won the general election. On 4 May Aznar became Prime Minister of Spain, and on 6 May Rato became both second Vice President and Minister of Economy and Finance. On 12 March 2000 the PP won again, this time with an absolute majority. His ministries were reorganised, and he gave all his responsibilities to Cristóbal Montoro Romero who became Minister of Finance. In his second term he had to fend off various charges of incompatibility between his public office and his private business interests.

Managing Director of the IMF

Rato became the managing director of the IMF on 7 June 2004, taking over from Anne Krueger, who had been acting as temporary Managing Director after Horst Köhler, who at that time was nominated (and later elected) President of Germany, resigned the post 4 March 2004.

In June 2007 Rato announced that he would resign from his post the following October, citing personal reasons. On 28 September 2007, the International Monetary Fund's 24 executive directors elected former French Minister for Economics, Finance, and Industry, Dominique Strauss-Kahn, over former Czech Prime Minister Josef Tošovský, to be the new managing director in succession to Rato.

Career in the private sector

Bankia
Rato assumed the presidency of Caja Madrid in 2010, a public savings bank based in the Community of Madrid, and after a merger with other six saving banks he assumed the presidency of the new group now called Bankia. On 7 May 2012, he resigned amid growing concerns about the solvency of the bank. Although the core capital ratio was 10,4%, the Popular Party Government planned to lend about 8 billion euro to the bank to increase its solvency, as was done before throughout Europe (e.g. ING and Northern Rock crisis). Due to his political ties to the governing PP, which decided to inject the funds, Rato resigned. He had his salary cut from €2.3 million to €600,000 annually in 2011 due to new laws for rescued banks.

Other activities
 International Airlines Group (IAG), Member of the Board of Directors
 Mapfre, Member of the Board of Directors (2010–2012)

Legal issues
On 4 July 2012, Rato, along with 30 other former members of the board of directors of Bankia, were charged with accounting irregularities. Bloomberg Businessweek listed Rato as the worst CEO in 2012. In 2011, Bankia had announced profits of €309 million; after Rato resigned, the figure was amended to €3 billion in losses. In October 2014, it became known that between 24 October 2010 to 28 November 2011, Rato made 519 purchases with a secret corporate credit card, spending a total of €99,041. Among these purchases he spent in one day were €3,547 in alcoholic beverages and €1,000 in shoes, along with 16 cash withdrawals of more than €1,000, most of them during the last months of his presidential term.

After a hearing 17 October 2014, the Spanish High Court judge Fernando Andreu assigned civil responsibility for the credit card abuse to Rodrigo Rato and Miguel Blesa. Rato was ordered to pay a bond of €3 million, and was expelled from the People's Party (PP).

The case went to court in 2016. On 23 February 2017, Rato was convicted and sentenced to four and a half years in prison. In 2020, the High Court acquitted Rato in a separate trial over falsifying accounts and other charges in the listing of Bankia when he was the bank’s chairman. It later granted him a semi-release which allowed him to serve the rest of his sentence in partial liberty.

References

External links

IMF biography
Guardian article on his appointment
Biography by CIDOB (in Spanish)
Rodrigo de Rato's Project Syndicate op/eds

1949 births
Living people
People from Madrid
People's Party (Spain) politicians
Complutense University of Madrid alumni
Economy and finance ministers of Spain
Managing directors of the International Monetary Fund
Haas School of Business alumni
Members of the 2nd Congress of Deputies (Spain)
Members of the 3rd Congress of Deputies (Spain)
Members of the 4th Congress of Deputies (Spain)
Members of the 5th Congress of Deputies (Spain)
Members of the 6th Congress of Deputies (Spain)
Members of the 7th Congress of Deputies (Spain)
Members of the 8th Congress of Deputies (Spain)
Deputy Prime Ministers of Spain
People named in the Panama Papers
Politicians convicted of embezzlement
Spanish politicians convicted of crimes
Spanish prisoners and detainees
Spanish officials of the United Nations
Directors of Bankia